Germany–Moldova relations are foreign relations between Germany and Moldova. Germany has an embassy in Chişinău. Moldova has an embassy in Berlin. Germany was one of the first countries to recognise the independence on Moldova and to set up a diplomatic mission.

History
Germany recognised independence of Moldova on 14 December 1991. Diplomatic relations between Moldova and Germany were established on 30 April 1992. Germany opened its embassy in Chişinău on 2 November 1992 and Moldova opened its own embassy in Bonn on 28 March 1995.

In May 2006, Moldovan president Vladimir Voronin visited Germany and met Angela Merkel. Merkel expressed Germany's interest in the Transnistrian problem's peaceful and quicker settlement with assistance from the European Union. Merkel also said the economic dimension of the bilateral Moldovan-German cooperation had "huge potential".
In October 2006, the President of Bundestag Norbert Lammert visited the Republic of Moldova.

On 26 June 2008, the German Parliament passed a motion supported by the majority of MPs that Germany reconfirmed its support for Moldova's European Union bid.

Economic cooperation

Germany is one of the most important Western commercial partners of the Republic of Moldova.  In 2007, Germany was the fourth biggest importer to Moldova.  The value of goods exported from Moldova to Germany amounted to € 145 million in 2007.  The value of goods exported from Germany to Moldova was € 270 million. After it became an immediate neighbour of the European Union, Moldova benefits from the EU Neighbourhood Policy and the awarded asymmetric trade preferences (ATP+) have interested numerous investors from Germany during the year. A number of German enterprises have opened local branches in Moldova. Among such  large German companies are Knauf, Mabanaft, Südzucker, and Metro AG.

See also
 Foreign relations of Germany
 Foreign relations of Moldova
 Moldova–EU relations
 Moldovans in Germany
 Germans in Moldova
 Accession of Moldova to the European Union

References

External links
 Embassy of the Republic of Moldova in Germany
 Embassy of Germany in Chisinau 
 Ministry of Foreign Affairs of the Republic of Moldova
 German Federal Foreign Office

 
Moldova
Bilateral relations of Moldova